The 2020 FFA Cup preliminary rounds were the qualifying competition initially meant to decide 22 of the 32 teams to take part in the 2020 FFA Cup. Some preliminary matches were held in February and March, prior to the competition being suspended in mid-March due to the COVID-19 pandemic in Australia.

The competition was cancelled on 3 July.

One of the member federation-based competitions resumed from July (for the Lakoseljac Cup in Tasmania).

Schedule
The fixtures for the competition are as follows.

 Some round dates in respective Federations overlap due to separate scheduling of Zones/Sub-Zones.
 Member federation matches played or scheduled since the overall competition was cancelled are shown in grey.

Format
The preliminary rounds structures are as follows, and refer to the different levels in the unofficial Australian association football league system:

First qualifying round:
65 Victorian clubs level 9 and below entered this stage.

Second qualifying round:
34 Victorian clubs progressed to this stage.

First round:
56 Victorian clubs (17 from the previous round and 39 level 8) entered this stage.
9 Western Australian clubs (Regional areas) entered this stage.

Second round:
121 New South Wales clubs (level 6 and below) entered this stage.
48 Northern New South Wales clubs (level 4 and below) entered this stage.
90 Queensland clubs (level 4 and below) entered this stage.
62 Victorian clubs (28 from the previous round and 34 level 7) entered this stage.
19 Western Australian clubs (5 from the previous round and 17 level 5 and below) entered this stage.

Third round:
12 ACT clubs (level 3 and below) entered this stage, although no games were played.
88 New South Wales clubs (65 from the previous round and 23 level 4–5) entered this stage.
45 Northern New South Wales clubs (8 from the previous round and 13 level 3) entered this stage.
79 Queensland clubs (59 from the previous round and 20 level 4 and below) entered this stage.
54 South Australian clubs (level 2 and below) entered this stage.
10 Tasmanian clubs (level 3) entered this stage.
101 Victorian clubs (31 from the previous round and 70 levels 3 to 6) entered this stage.

Fourth round:
8 ACT clubs (level 2) entered this stage, although no games were played.
8 Northern New South Wales clubs (8 from the previous round  – Northern Zone) participated in this stage before the competition was abandoned.
9 Northern Territory clubs (level 2 and below) entered this stage.
64 Queensland clubs (40 from the previous round and 24 level 2 and 3) entered this stage.
16 Tasmanian clubs (8 from the previous round and 8 level 2) entered this stage, with the competition resuming on 11 July.

Fifth round:
3 Queensland clubs (from Far North Queensland and North Queensland) reached this stage before the competition was abandoned.
8 Tasmanian clubs progressed to this stage.

Sixth round:
4 Tasmanian clubs progressed to this stage.

Seventh round:
2 Tasmanian clubs progressed to this stage, which was the Grand Final of the Milan Lakoseljac Cup.

Key to Abbreviations

First qualifying round 

Notes:
 w/o = Walkover
 † = After Extra Time
 VIC Byes – Falcons 2000 (-), Hampton Park United Sparrows FC (-), Old Mentonians (-).

Second qualifying round

Notes:
 w/o = Walkover
 † = After Extra Time

First round

Notes:
 w/o = Walkover
 † = After Extra Time
 WA Byes – Twin City Saints SC (-).

Second round

Notes:

 † = After Extra Time
 NSW Byes – Broulee Stingrays FC (-), Bulli FC (-), Castle Hill United FC (-), Central Coast Wolves FC (-), Coniston FC (-), Gunners FC (-), Marayong FC (-), Redbacks FC (-), Springwood United FC (-).
 NNSW Byes – Bellingen FC (-), Boambee Bombers FC (4), Coffs City United FC (4), Dudley Redhead United Senior FC (4), Dudley Redhead United FC (4), Kotara South FC (4), Macleay Valley Rangers FC (4), Mayfield United Senior FC (-), Moree Services FC (5), North United Wolves SC (-), Oxley Vale Attunga FC (4), Port United SC (4), Sawtell FC (-), Wallis Lakes-Great Lakes United (-), Westlawn Tigers FC (4), Woolgoolga Wolves (4).
 QLD Byes – Across The Waves (-), Broadbeach United (4), Burleigh Heads Bulldogs (4), Caloundra FC (4), Clinton FC (-), CQU Berserker Bears (-), Frenchville FC (-), Kangaroo Point Rovers (6), Kawana (4), KSS Jets FC (-), Logan Village FC (7), Maroochydore FC (4), Narangba (-), Nerang FC (4), New Farm United FC (5), Newmarket (6), North Pine (4), Redcliffe PCYC FC (7), Robina City (5), Samford Rangers FC (5), Slacks Creek (6), Southport (4), St. George Willawong FC (5), Taringa Rovers (4), Teviot Downs SC (7), The Gap (4), The Lakes FC (6), Toowong (4).

Third round
In the ACT and South Australia, a draw was conducted but no matches were played.

 

Notes:
 w/o = Walkover
 † = After Extra Time
 NNSW Byes – Singleton Strikers FC (3).
 QLD Byes – MA Olympic FC (-).
 TAS Byes – Beachside (3), Launceston United (3), Metro FC (3), Somerset (3), Taroona (3), University of Tasmania (3).
 VIC Byes – Surf Coast (8).

Fourth round
In Tasmania, the Lakoseljac Cup recommenced in July, after the cancellation of the overall FFA Cup competition. In the Northern Territory a draw was made, but no matches were played.

Fifth round
The Lakoseljac Cup competition continued in Tasmania, which was the only member federation still running a cup competition that had been part of the FFA Cup preliminary rounds. The match between South Hobart and Kingborough Lions United (originally won 3–2 by South Hobart) had to be replayed after an administrative team-sheet breach.

Sixth round

Seventh round
The only match played in this round was the grand final of the Lakoseljac Cup competition in Tasmania.

References

External links
 Official website

FFA Cup preliminary
FFA Cup preliminary
FFA
Australia Cup preliminary rounds